Acceleration at Navarra was the second weekend of Acceleration 2014, a multi-day festival combining top class car and bike racing with live music and other entertainment. The festival was organised by the International Sport Racing Association (ISRA), based in the Netherlands, to be held six times in 2014, starting 25–27 April in Portimao, Portugal and ending 17–19 October in Assen, Netherlands. The various racing competitions were
Formula Acceleration 1 (FA1), the MW-V6 Pickup Series, the Legend SuperCup (LSC), the European Stock 1000 Series (ACC 1000) and the European Stock 600 Series (ACC 600).

Every driver entering Acceleration 2014 was eligible for points in the drivers' championship as well as the nations' championship. As for music and entertainment, David Hasselhoff was the host of "Celebrate the 80's and the 90's with The Hoff", a dance party featuring 2 Unlimited, Haddaway, and others. Saturday evenings were filled with performances of international DJs.

FA1 results

Driver changes
Nathanaël Berthon replaced Sergio Campana at Acceleration Team France. Campana replaced Armando Parente and drove for Portugal, while Parente joined the Chinese team. Oliver Campos-Hull therefore moved to Team Spain, replacing Victor Garcia. Finally, the Danish-born Dennis Lind took Felix Rosenqvist's seat at the Swedish team.

Free practices

Qualifying sessions

Qualifying 1:
 #45 – fastest lap time disallowed for not respecting track limits
Qualifying 2:
 #7, #20 – fastest lap time disallowed for not respecting track limits
 #10, #16, #45 – lap time in which track limits were disrespected was cancelled

Race 1

Race 2

 #10 – 25 second penalty, #16 – 10 second penalty

Drivers' championship standings after 4 out of 10 races

Nations' championship standings after 4 out of 10 races

MW-V6 results

Free practices

Qualifying sessions

Race 1

Race 2

Race 3

Drivers' championship standings after 6 out of 18 races

Nations' championship standings after 6 out of 18 races

Legend SuperCup results

Free practices

Race 1

Race 2

 #47 – 25 second penalty

Race 3

Race 4

Drivers' championship standings after 8 out of 24 races

Nations' championship standings after 8 out of 24 races

European Stock 1000 Series results

Free practices

Qualifying sessions

Race

Championship standings after 1 out of 2 races

European Stock 600 Series results

Free practices

Qualifying sessions

Race

Championship standings after 1 out of 2 races

References

Main source
Raceresults.nu

Other references

Navarra
Acceleration